Tony Cliff (born Yigael Glückstein, ; 20 May 1917 – 9 April 2000) was a Trotskyist activist. Born to a Jewish family in Palestine, he moved to Britain in 1947 and by the end of the 1950s had assumed the pen name of Tony Cliff. A founding member of the Socialist Review Group, which became the International Socialists and then the Socialist Workers Party, in 1977 Cliff was effectively the leader of all three.

Biography

Tony Cliff was born Yigael Glückstein in Zikhron Ya'akov in the Ottoman Empire's Mutasarrifate of Jerusalem (in what is now Israel), in 1917, the same year Britain seized control of the territory from the Ottoman Empire during World War I. He was one of four children born to Akiva and Esther Glückstein, Jewish immigrants from Poland, who had come to Palestine as part of the Second Aliyah. His father was an engineer and contractor. He had two brothers and a sister; his brother Chaim later became a notable journalist, theatre critic, and translator. Through his sister Alexandra, he was the uncle of Israeli graphic designer David Tartakover. Cliff grew up in British-ruled Mandatory Palestine; notable Zionist and future Israeli Prime Minister Moshe Sharett was a family friend and frequent visitor to his family home. He had two prominent uncles: the noted doctor Hillel Yaffe and agronomist and Zionist activist . His piano teacher was a sister of Chaim Weizmann, the first President of Israel, and his father's business partner was one of Weizmann's brothers.

He attended school in Jerusalem, then studied at the Technion in Haifa, before dropping out and studying economics at the Hebrew University of Jerusalem. In his youth, he came to identify with Communism, though he never joined the Communist Party of Palestine, as he had not met any of its members before becoming a socialist activist. However, he did join the socialist-Zionist youth movement Hashomer Hatzair, and soon became not only a Trotskyist in 1933, but also a confirmed opponent of Zionism. Along with other Hashomer Hatzair members, he joined the illegal Palestine Revolutionary Communist League, necessitating the use of several pseudonyms in three languages.

With the beginning of World War II, Glückstein was active in efforts to oppose mobilization of Jews to the British war effort, seeing the war as a struggle between imperialists. He was arrested by the British and imprisoned for the duration of the war. After his release he met his wife Chanie Rosenberg, a Jewish immigrant from South Africa, and they moved in together in Tel Aviv in 1945. They moved to Britain in 1947, but Cliff was never able to become a British citizen and remained a stateless person for the rest of his life. To the end of his life he spoke English with a distinct Palestinian accent. He was deported by the British authorities and lived in the Republic of Ireland for several years. During this period, he was active in left-wing circles in Dublin, and was acquainted with Owen Sheehy-Skeffington and his wife, Andrée. He was permitted to take up British residency due only to the status of his wife Chanie as a British citizen. Living in London, Glückstein again became active with the Revolutionary Communist Party, on to the leadership of which he had been co-opted. For most purposes, Glückstein was a supporter of the leadership of the RCP around Jock Haston, and as such he was involved with the discussions concerning the nature of those states dominated by Russia and the Communist parties initiated by a faction within the RCP. This debate was linked to other discussions on the nationalised industries in Britain and the increasingly critical stance of Haston and the RCP as to the leadership of the Fourth International with regard to Eastern Europe and Yugoslavia in particular.

On the break-up of the RCP, Glückstein’s supporters joined Gerry Healy's group The Club although, having been deported to Ireland, Glückstein himself did not. In 1950, he helped launch the Socialist Review Group, which was based on a journal of the same name. This was to be the main publication for which Glückstein wrote during the 1950s, until it was superseded by International Socialism in 1960, eventually ceasing publication altogether in 1962.

By the time he gained permanent residency in Britain his supporters in The Club had been expelled due to differences on Birmingham Trades Council regarding socialist policy concerning the Korean War, where Glückstein's co-factionalists refused to take a position of support for either side in the war.

Owing to his lack of established residency rights in Britain, and during his earlier exile in Ireland, Glückstein used the name Roger or Roger Tennant as a pseudonym. The first edition of his short book on Rosa Luxemburg in 1959 was possibly the first use of the pen name 'Tony Cliff'. In the 1960s, Cliff would revive many of his earlier pseudonyms in the pages of International Socialism in which journal reviews are to be found by Roger, Roger Tennant, Sakhry, Lee Rock and Tony Cliff, but none by Yigael or Yg'al Glückstein.

Glückstein’s group was renamed the International Socialists in 1962, and was to grow from fewer than 100 members in 1960 until it claimed in the region of 3,000 in 1977, at which point it was renamed the Socialist Workers Party (SWP). Cliff remained a leading member until his death in 2000. He was central to the various reorientations carried out in the SWP to react to changes in the position of the working class. In particular, after the high level of strike activity in the early seventies, he argued in the late seventies that the working class movement was entering a "downturn" and that the party's activity should be radically changed as a result. A fierce debate ensued, which Cliff's side eventually won. Trotskyist writer Samuel Farber, a long-time supporter of the International Socialist Organization in the US, has argued that the internal party regime established by Cliff during this period is "reminiscent of the one established by Zinoviev in the mid-twenties in the USSR" consequently leading to the various crises and splits in the group later on.

Cliff's biography is, as he himself remarked, inseparable from that of the groups of which he was a leading member.

Shortly before his death he underwent a major surgical operation on his heart.

Ideology 

Cliff was a revolutionary socialist in the Trotskyist tradition, attempting to make Lenin's theory of the party effective in the present day. Much of his theoretical writing was aimed at immediate tasks of the party at the time.

Since then, the consensus in most Trotskyist groups has been that all the states dominated by Stalinist parties – which are characterised by state planning and state ownership of property – are to be seen as 'degenerated workers' states' (The Soviet Union) or 'deformed workers' states' (other Stalinist states, including much of Eastern Europe). In many ways, Cliff was the main dissident from this idea, although some of his opponents have sought to associate his state capitalist view with other ideas: for example, the theory of 'bureaucratic collectivism' associated with Shachtmanite Workers Party in the United States. However, Cliff himself was insistent that his ideas owed nothing to those of Max Shachtman, or earlier proponents of the theory such as Bruno Rizzi, and made this clear in his work Bureaucratic Collectivism – A Critique.

Nevertheless, in the 1950s, his group distributed literature published by Shachtman's group and the theory of the 'permanent arms economy', which was considered one of the pillars of what became the International Socialist Tendency, and originated with Shachtman's group, though it is sometimes claimed that Cliff refused to acknowledge this publicly.

Personal life 

Cliff had little or no time for any activities not directly linked to the needs of building his party (with the exception of caring for his family). He did not drink or smoke, or socialise very much. Cliff's wife, Chanie Rosenberg (1922–2021), was an active member successively of the SRG, IS and SWP, in which she remained active for many years. As well as authoring many articles on social questions for the group's publications, she was an activist in the National Union of Teachers until her retirement. In addition, three of the couple's four children became members of the SWP, with one son, Donny Gluckstein, co-authoring two books with his father.

Cliff is depicted as Jimmy Rock of the Rockers in Tariq Ali's satire Redemption.

Selected works
The Problem of the Middle East (1946)
The Nature of Stalinist Russia (1948)
Stalin's Satellites in Europe (1952)
Stalinist Russia: A Marxist Analysis (1955)
Perspectives of the Permanent War Economy (1957)
Economic Roots of Reformism (1957)
Rosa Luxemburg: A Study(1959)
Trotsky on Substitionism (1960)
Deflected Permanent Revolution (1963)
Incomes Policy, Legislation and Shop Stewards (with Colin Barker) (1966)
France: The Struggle Goes On (with Ian Birchall) (1968)
The Employers’ Offensive, Productivity Deals and how to fight them (1970)
The Crisis: Social Contract or Socialism (1975)
Lenin Vol. 1: Building the Party (1975)
Portugal at the Crossroads (1975)
Lenin Vol. 2: All Power to the Soviets (1976)
Lenin Vol. 3: Revolution Besieged (1978)
Lenin Vol. 4: The Bolsheviks and World Communism (1979)
Class Struggle and Women’s Liberation, 1640 to today (1984)
Marxism and trade union struggle, the general strike of 1926 (with Donny Gluckstein) (1986)
 The Labour Party, A Marxist History (with Donny Gluckstein) (1986)
Trotsky Vol. 1: Towards October 1879-1917 (1989)
Trotsky Vol. 2: The Sword of the Revolution 1917-1923 (1990)
Trotsky Vol. 3: Fighting the Rising Stalinist Bureaucracy 1923-1927 (1991)
Trotsky Vol. 4: The darker the Night, the Brighter the Star 1927-1940 (1993)
Trotskyism after Trotsky, the origins of the International Socialists (1999)
A World to Win: Life of a Revolutionary (2000)
Marxism at the Millennium (2000)

Archives 

 A Summary Description of the Tony Cliff papers held at the Modern Records Centre, University of Warwick Library. Online abstract available. Retrieved 16 June 2006.

See also 
Bureaucratic collectivism
Deflected permanent revolution
New class
Permanent revolution
State capitalism

Notes

References
Articles

 

Biographies

 Ian Birchall, Tony Cliff: A Marxist for His Time (London: Bookmarks, 2011)

External links 
 Tony Cliff Internet Archive, biography and collection of his writings from 1938–2000 on Marxists.org.
 "50 Years of the International Socialist Tradition:  Ahmed Shawki interviews Tony Cliff in 1997, 50 years after the publication of State Capitalism in Russia." International Socialist Review, No.1, Summer 1997, pp. 27–31.
Obituary by Paul Foot, The Guardian (2000).
Obituary by Duncan Hallas, Socialist Review (2000).
Talkin' 'bout a revolutionary Interview with Ian Birchall about Cliff, International Socialism 131 (2011). 
Tony Cliff matters for socialists today by Alex Callinicos, Socialist Worker (2017)
Tony Cliff by Ian Taylor, Socialist Review, 360 (2011)
Tony Cliff rediscovered, International Socialism, 132 (2011). 
 More Years for the Locust: The Origins of the SWP Criticism of Cliff and the SWP by Jim Higgins, a former colleague.
 Talks by Tony Cliff on Lenin and State Capitalism in MP3
 Tony Cliff (1917–2000) : Links to biographies, obituaries and websites, compiled by Modkraft Biblioteket - Progressive online library.
  Bibliography  -  the writings and works of Tony Cliff by Ian Birchall on Modkraft Biblioteket.
Catalogue of Cliff's papers, held at the Modern Records Centre, University of Warwick

1917 births
2000 deaths
20th-century British writers
20th-century British male writers
20th-century British Jews
People from Zikhron Ya'akov
Anti-Stalinist left
Anti-Zionist Jews
Ashkenazi Jews in Ottoman Palestine
British Jewish writers
British political writers
British Trotskyists
British people of Polish-Jewish descent
International Socialist Tendency
Jewish socialists
Ashkenazi Jews in Mandatory Palestine
Marxist theorists
Palestinian political writers
Political party founders
Prisoners and detainees of the United Kingdom
Revolutionary Communist Party (UK, 1944) members
Socialist Workers Party (UK) members
Stateless people
British revolutionaries
20th-century pseudonymous writers
Mandatory Palestine emigrants to the United Kingdom
British people of Palestinian-Jewish descent